The Stockholm Appeal was an initiative launched by the World Peace Council on 19 March 1950 to promote nuclear disarmament and prevent atomic war.

Background 
On 15 March 1950, the World Peace Council approved the Stockholm Appeal, calling for an absolute ban on nuclear weapons. The appeal was initiated by the French physicist, communist and 1935 Nobel laureate in Chemistry Frédéric Joliot-Curie. About two weeks after the start of the Korean War, the initiative's first publication called Peacegram claimed that the appeal has already earned 1.5 million signatories. The total gathered petitions were allegedly signed by 273,470,566 persons (including the entire adult population of the Soviet Union). The appeal was also signed by many prominent public figures, artists, and intellectuals. The text of the appeal read: We demand the outlawing of atomic weapons as instruments of intimidation and mass murder of peoples. We demand strict international control to enforce this measure.

We believe that any government which first uses atomic weapons against any other country whatsoever will be committing a crime against humanity and should be dealt with as a war criminal.

We call on all men and women of good will throughout the world to sign this appeal.

Anti-Communist responses 
The United States dismissed the Stockholm Appeal, with the U.S. Secretary of State Dean Acheson branding it as "a propaganda trick in the spurious 'peace offensive' of the Soviet Union."

Anti-communists in France responded to the Stockholm Appeal (French: L'Appel de Stockholm) by setting up the Paix et Liberté group to counter the Communist propaganda with their own: one of their first posters was La Pelle de Stockholm ("The Spade of Stockholm") digging the graves of the countries in Eastern Europe that had been subjugated by the Soviets.

Notable signatories 

 Jorge Amado, Brazilian writer and member of the Brazilian Academy of Letters
 Herbert Aptheker, American historian and political activist
 Louis Aragon, French poet
 Pierre Benoit, French novelist and member of the Académie française
 Leonard Bernstein, American composer and conductor
 Rudolf Carnap, German philosopher and advocate of logical positivism
 Marcel Carné, French film director
 Marc Chagall, Russian-French artist
 Maurice Chevalier, French actor and cabaret singer
 Jacques Chirac, French politician and later President of France (1995–2007)
 Frank Marshall Davis, American journalist, poet and activist
 W. E. B. Du Bois, American sociologist, historian and activist
 James Gareth Endicott, Canadian clergyman and Christian missionary
 Ilya Ehrenburg, Soviet-Jewish writer, journalist and historian
 Lion Feuchtwanger, German-Jewish novelist and playwright
 Vincent Glinsky, American sculptor
 Dashiell Hammett, American novelist and screenwriter 
 Leo Hurwitz, American documentary filmmaker
 Frédéric Joliot-Curie, French physicist, 1935 Nobel Prize in Chemistry laureate and President of the World Peace Council (1950–1958)
 Lionel Jospin, French politician and later Prime Minister of France (1997–2002)
 Alfred E. Kahn, American journalist, publisher, and head of the Jewish People's Fraternal Order
 Rockwell Kent, American painter and graphic artist
 Robert Lamoureux, French actor, screenwriter and film director
 Artur Lundkvist, Swedish author, critic and member of the Swedish Academy
 Thomas Mann, German writer, essayist and 1929 Nobel Prize in Literature laureate
 Moa Martinson, Swedish author of proletarian literature
 Henri Matisse, French painter and sculptor
 Yves Montand, Italian-French actor and singer
 Pablo Neruda, Chilean poet, diplomat and 1971 Nobel Prize in Literature laureate
 Noël-Noël, French actor and screenwriter
 Erwin Panofsky, German-Jewish art historian
 Charlie Parker, American jazz saxophonist and composer
 Gérard Philipe, French stage and film actor
 Pablo Picasso, Spanish painter, sculptor and poet
 Jacques Prévert, French poet and screenwriter
 Pierre Renoir, French stage and film actor
 Muriel Rukeyser, American-Jewish poet and activist
 Armand Salacrou, French dramatist
 George Bernard Shaw, Irish playwright, critic and activist
 Dmitri Shostakovich, Soviet composer and pianist
 Simone Signoret, French film actress
 Michel Simon, Swiss stage and film actor
 Henri Wallon, French psychologist, philosopher and politician
 Harry F. Ward, English-American Methodist minister and Christian socialist
 Maria Wine, Swedish-Danish poet
 Urho Kekkonen, Finnish Prime Minister
 Vittorio Emanuele Orlando, former Italian Prime Minister
 Lázaro Cárdenas, former President of Mexico

References 

1950 documents
Anti–nuclear weapons movement
1950 in Sweden
World Peace Council